Stuart Borrowman is a Scottish politician who has been an independent councillor for the Armadale and Blackridge ward since the 2007 West Lothian Council election. Originally elected as a member of the Scottish National Party (SNP) and serving as then-leader John Swinney's Chief of Staff from 2001 to 2002, he defected to Scottish Labour in 2004 before becoming an independent.

Borrowman also voted against Scottish independence in the 2014 Scottish independence referendum, claiming his old party failed to put together a convincing case, especially over the country's future currency.

References

Living people
Independent councillors in the United Kingdom
Year of birth missing (living people)